Motala Idrottspark  is a football stadium in Motala, Sweden  and the home stadium for the football team Motala AIF. Motala Idrottspark has a total capacity of 8,500 spectators.

References 

Football venues in Sweden
Sport in Motala